Labiobarbus fasciatus is a species of ray-finned fish in the genus Labiobarbus found in Indonesia and Malaysia.

References

fasciatus
Taxa named by Pieter Bleeker
Fish described in 1853